Homam Al-Amin Ahmed (born 25 August 1999) is a Qatari professional footballer who plays as a left back for Qatar Stars League side Al-Gharafa and the Qatar national football team.

Career statistics

International goals
Scores and results list Qatar's goal tally first.

Honours

Club
Al-Gharafa
Qatari Stars Cup: 2017-18, 2018-19

References

External links
 
 

1999 births
Living people
Qatari footballers
Qatari expatriate footballers
Qatar international footballers
Association football defenders
Al-Gharafa SC players
K.A.S. Eupen players
Qatar Stars League players
Belgian Pro League players
Expatriate footballers in Belgium
Qatari expatriate sportspeople in Belgium
2021 CONCACAF Gold Cup players
Qatar under-20 international footballers
Qatar youth international footballers
2022 FIFA World Cup players